Radio Monique was an offshore radio station broadcasting to the Netherlands and Belgium from the Radio Caroline ship, Ross Revenge.

Originally intended to broadcast in 1981 from a new radio ship called MV Magda Maria alongside a station to be called Radio Paradijs, this arrangement fell through and Radio Paradijs never did make it to air, except for some test transmissions. On the way over to Europe the ship lost part of its aerial. Shortly after commencing tests, the Dutch navy towed the ship away. Monique however entered into an agreement with Ronan O'Rahilly of Radio Caroline to rent airtime on 963 kHz from October 1984. In fact, following antenna problems, the station began test transmissions on 15 December 1984 and commenced full programming at midday the following day on 963 kHz. Radio Caroline had broadcast for over a year from the Ross Revenge but failed to attract enough advertising to be able to continue alone.

The station's theme tune was an edited version of the Theme from Terrahawks by Richard Harvey.

In October 1987 Radio Monique was sold and a month later moved to 819 kHz. This move was necessary because Finland had started up a new 600 kW transmitter on 963 kHz. Shortly after, during a storm on 25 November 1987, the aerial mast broke on board the Ross Revenge. Caroline returned fairly quickly with a makeshift aerial but was initially unable to offer Monique a sufficient quality service. In May 1988, another station with Dutch language programming was launched from the Ross Revenge under the name Radio 558, later Radio 819. This was largely seen as the successor to Radio Monique, as it contained many of the same programmes, advertisers and disc jockeys.

Monique, Radio
Radio stations established in 1984
Pirate radio stations
Radio stations disestablished in 1987

Defunct radio stations in the Netherlands 
Defunct mass media in Belgium